Albert Sylvester may refer to:

 Albert Hale Sylvester (1871–1944), surveyor, explorer, and forest supervisor in the U.S. state of Washington
 A. J. Sylvester (Albert James Sylvester, 1889–1989), Principal Private Secretary to British politician David Lloyd George